Ken Armstrong may refer to:

 Ken Armstrong (Australian footballer) (1936–2009), Australian rules football player and coach for Perth and later commentator
 Ken Armstrong (diver) (born 1953), Canadian Olympic diver
 Ken Armstrong (footballer, born 1924) (1924–1984), Chelsea F.C. footballer, and English and New Zealand dual-international
 Ken Armstrong (footballer, born 1959), English-born footballer who played with among others Kilmarnock F.C. and Birmingham City F.C.
 Ken Armstrong (journalist), American journalist
 Ken Armstrong (motorcyclist), Grand Prix motorcycle racer from Great Britain